Lachlan Boshier (born 16 November 1994) is a New Zealand rugby union player who currently plays as a loose forward for  in New Zealand's domestic Mitre 10 Cup and the  in the international Super Rugby competition.

Early career

Boshier was born in New Plymouth and attended New Plymouth Boys' High School where he captained their first XV.   Upon leaving school, he took up a building apprenticeship while making his way through the ranks in his local province, Taranaki.

Senior career

Boshier debuted for Taranaki during their Premiership winning season of 2014, however due to strong competition for places he only appeared once that year.

Super Rugby career

Season ending injuries to flankers Mitchell Karpik and Sam Henwood, saw Boshier called into the Chiefs Super Rugby squad early in 2016.   He acquitted himself well at that level and featured in 7 games, scoring one try as his side reached the semi-finals of the competition.   He was subsequently promoted to the franchise's full squad for the 2017 Super Rugby season.

International career

Boshier represented New Zealand at schoolboy level and was a member of the New Zealand Under-20 side which competed in the 2014 IRB Junior World Championship in his home country.

Career Honours

Taranaki

Mitre 10 Cup Premiership - 2014

Super Rugby statistics

References

1994 births
Living people
New Zealand rugby union players
Rugby union flankers
Chiefs (rugby union) players
Taranaki rugby union players
Rugby union players from New Plymouth
People educated at New Plymouth Boys' High School
Saitama Wild Knights players